Miss Universo Chile 2013, the 50th Miss Universo Chile pageant, was held on October 6th, 2013. The winner, María Jesús Matthei, represented her country in Miss Universe 2013 in Moscow, Russia on November 9th, 2013.

Final results

Special awards
 Miss Rostro 2013 - Carla Valenzuela Donoso (Araucanía)
 Miss Congeniality 2013 - María Jesús Matthei (Tarapacá)
 Best Hair 2013 - Florencia Dunnage (Coquimbo)
 Miss Chileancharm 2013 - María Jesús Matthei (Tarapacá)

Delegates 
The 15 Official Delegates were presented on October 02th, 2013.

Jury

 Nicolás Massú, Tennis Player
 Antonio Vodanovic, TV Presenter
 Mauro Porcia, Cosmetic Surgeon
 Marie Ann Salas, Miss International Chile 2007 (Semifinalist) / Miss Tourism Queen International Chile 2008 (Finalist)
 Beatriz Vicencio
 José Alfredo Fuentes, TV Presenter / Singer
 Marcelo Marocchino, Singer
 Gianella Marengo, TV Presenter
 Tiago Cunha

Notes
 The pageant was organized by Luciano Marrochino, Juan Andrés Sastre from Kreatore and Jorge Luis Uribe.
 María Jesús Matthei participated for the first time in 2011, where she became the 1st Runner-up.
 Florencia Dunnage participated in Miss World Chile 2013, where she was one of the 8 finalists.
 María Jose Barrena, participated in Reina Hispanoamericana 2013, where she became the 2nd Runner-up.

References

External links
 Official Miss Universo Chile Website
 Official Miss Universo Chile Facebook

Miss Universo Chile
2013 in Chile
2013 beauty pageants